Dushman Zamana is a 1992 Indian action film directed by Jagdish A. Sharma. It stars Divya Bharti and Armaan Kohli in the leading roles.

Synopsis
Seema (Divya Bharti) is a dreamy young college student born into a wealthy family. Her father (Paresh Rawal) is a successful businessman and unlike Seema, very money-minded. Seema's schoolmate Vijay (Armaan Kohli) is a poor orphan who does very well in his studies to someday be able to afford a better life. Unaware of the consequences, Seema soon falls in love with Vijay and they both become a couple, while keeping it a secret. In class, Seema dreamily writes Vijay's name on a sheet of paper which then later gets discovered by her father. He finds out about Vijay's poor background and opposes the relationship between his daughter and Vijay. When asked about her preference to whether stay with her father and keep living a wealthy lifestyle or stay with Vijay and live the life of a poor woman, Seema chooses Vijay out of love. Her father sees himself forced to get his daughter back in another way by hiring a criminal (Kiran Kumar) to frame Vijay for murder.

Cast

Armaan Kohli ... Vijay
Divya Bharti ... Seema Narang
Paresh Rawal ... D.K.Narang Seema's father
Kiran Kumar...Sanga
Gulshan Grover..Thapa
Mukri...Mickey Seth
Anoop Kumar...Security Guard
Firoz Irani... Sohan Kapoor, Automobile Company Owner
Ishrat Ali...Agnihotri
Dinesh Hingoo...Shamsher Singh, Government Rest House Caretaker
Bhushan Jeevan...Police Commissioner

Soundtracks
Dushman Zamana was one of the hit albums of 1992. The song "Mausam Pyaara Bheega Bheega" was a big hit. The music was given by Kishore Sharma and Mahesh Sharma.
"Dil Ye Pukaare Aaja Sanam" - Kavita Krishnamurthy
"Mausam Pyaara Bheega Bheega" - Kumar Sanu & Alka Yagnik
"Meri Jaan Mere Ishq Mein" - Mohammed Aziz & Shobha Joshi
"Mohabbat Ki Kitabon Mein" (female) - Kavita Krishnamurthy
"Mohabbat Ki Kitabon Mein" (male) - Kumar Sanu

References

External links

1990s Hindi-language films